
Year 677 (DCLXXVII) was a common year starting on Thursday (link will display the full calendar) of the Julian calendar. The denomination 677 for this year has been used since the early medieval period, when the Anno Domini calendar era became the prevalent method in Europe for naming years.

Events 
<onlyinclude>

By place

Europe 
 The Onogur Bulgars are scattered by the Khazars, who then establish a great Steppe empire, centered on the Lower Volga. The Onogurs depart to the Pannonian Plain.
 Warinus, Frankish nobleman, is stoned to death near Arras, because of a feud between his brother, Leodegar (bishop of Autun), and Ebroin, the Mayor of the Palace of Neustria.
 25 – 27 July: Climax of the Siege of Thessalonica: Slavic forces launch a large-scale assault on the city walls, but are repelled.

Asia 
 Tang China declares the deposed Bojang of Goguryeo "King of Joseon", placing him in charge of the Liaodong area under the Protectorate General to Pacify the East.

Americas 
 At Pulil, the army of Calakmul vanquishes the insurgency led by Nuun Ujol Chaak, meaning B'alaj Chan K'awiil is able to return to rule Dos Pilas, from his exile in the kingdom of Hix Witz.

Births 
 Abdallah ibn Abd al-Malik, Arab general (approximate date)
 Clovis IV, King of the Franks (d. 694)
 Muḥammad ibn ‘Alī, fifth Shi'a Imam and descendant of Prophet Muhammad (approximate date; d. 733)
 Nanyue Huairang, Chinese Zen Buddhist patriarch (d. 744)

Deaths 
 Constantine I, patriarch of Constantinople
 Drest VI, king of the Picts
 Vincent Madelgarius, Frankish monk
 Warinus, Frankish nobleman

References